This is a list of films, shows and specials involving production or distribution by the Canadian production studio Nelvana, a subsidiary of Corus Entertainment.

Feature films

Theatrical
 Rock & Rule (1983) 
 The Care Bears Movie (1985)
 Care Bears Movie II: A New Generation (1986)
 The Care Bears Adventure in Wonderland (1987)
 Burglar (1987) – live-action
 Babar: The Movie (1989, co-production with Ellipse Programme)
 Malice (1993) – live-action; uncredited
 Spaceman (1997) – live-action
 Pippi Longstocking (1997)
 Babar: King of the Elephants (1999, co-production with TMO-Loonland Film GmbH)
 Heidi (2005, co-production with TV-Loonland AG and Telemagination, released theatrically in Germany)
 Franklin and the Turtle Lake Treasure (2006) (co-production with StudioCanal)

Direct-to-video
 The Legend of the North Wind (1997, English dubbed version)
 Donkey Kong Country: The Legend of the Crystal Coconut (1999) (CGI)
 Cardcaptors: The Movie (2000; English dubbed version)
 Redwall: The Movie (2000, edit of Series 1 of Redwall)
 Franklin and the Green Knight (2000)
 Franklin's Magic Christmas (2001)
 The Little Bear Movie (2001)
 Rolie Polie Olie: The Great Defender of Fun (2002) (CGI)
 Rolie Polie Olie: The Baby Bot Chase (2003) (CGI)
 Back to School with Franklin (2003)
 Rescue Heroes: The Movie (2003)
 Care Bears: Journey to Joke-a-lot (2004) (CGI)
 Beyblade: Fierce Battle (2005, English dubbed version)
 The Care Bears' Big Wish Movie (2005) (CGI)
 Mike the Knight: Journey to Dragon Mountain (2014) (with HIT Entertainment)

Other
 Voulez-vous coucher avec God? (1972)
 125 Rooms of Comfort (1974) – titles
 Jefferson Starship (1983) – live-action (co-production with East Media for RCA VideoDiscs)
 Grace Under Pressure Tour (1986) – rear screen films
 Three Amigos (1986) – animation
 The Return of the North Wind (1994; distribution licensing)
Attack of the Killer B-Movies (1995) – live-action

Television specials
 Christmas Two Step (1975) – combining live-action and animation
 A Cosmic Christmas (1977)
 The Devil and Daniel Mouse (1978)
 How We Made The Devil and Daniel Mouse (1978)
 Star Wars Holiday Special (1978) – live-action; includes animated sequence from the company
 Romie-0 and Julie-8 (1979)
 Intergalactic Thanksgiving (1979)
 Easter Fever (1980) (with Topcraft)
 Take Me Up to the Ball Game (1980)
 The Magic of Herself the Elf (1983)
 Strawberry Shortcake: Housewarming Surprise (1983)
 Strawberry Shortcake and the Baby Without a Name (1984)
 Strawberry Shortcake Meets the Berrykins (1985)
 Atkinson Film-Arts television specials (distributor):
 The Body Electric (1985)
 Rumpelstiltskin (1985)
 The Velveteen Rabbit (1985)
 For Better or For Worse: The Bestest Present (1985)
 Babar and Father Christmas (1985)
 The Tin Soldier (1986)
 The Nightingale (1987)
 The Great Heep (1986)
 Madballs: Escape from Orb! (1986)
 My Pet Monster (1986)
 The Wild Puffalumps (1987)
 The Rocket Boy (1987) – live-action (co-production for Orion Television)
 Spies, Lies & Naked Thighs (1988) – main title design
 Care Bears Nutcracker Suite (1988)
 HBO Storybook Musicals (1991) – "The Tale of Peter Rabbit"
 The Rosey and Buddy Show (1992)
 Santa's First Christmas (1992) (with EVA Entertainment, Siriol Productions, and S4C)
 The Incredible Crash Dummies (1993) (with Lamb and Company, Tyco, and Fox Kids)
 The Santa Claus Brothers (2001) – CGI
 Miss Spider's Sunny Patch Kids (2003) – CGI
 Miss Spider's Sunny Patch Friends: The Prince, the Princess and the Bee (2006) – CGI
 A Franklin and Friends Adventure: Polar Explorer (2014) – CGI
 A Franklin and Friends: Deep Sea Voyage (2014) – CGI
 Lucky Duck (2014) (with Disney Junior) – CGI
 Thomas & Friends: Race for the Sodor Cup (2021) (with Mattel Television)
 Thomas & Friends: Mystery at Lookout Mountain (2023) (with Mattel Television)
 This Was Our Pact (TBA) (with Duncan Studio and Estuary Films) - direct-to-streaming

Television series

1970s
 Small Star Cinema (1974–1975) – live-action/animation series

1980s
 Mr. Microchip (1983) – live-action
 20 Minute Workout (1983–1985) – live-action
 The Edison Twins (1983–1986) – live-action
 Inspector Gadget (1983) (Series 1 only, co-production with DIC Audiovisuel, Field Communications and LBS Communications (now Fremantle (company))
 The Get Along Gang (1984, pilot episode) – co-produced with DIC Audiovisuel
 Star Wars: Droids (1985–1986)
 Star Wars: Ewoks (1985–1987)
 The Care Bears Family (1986–1988)
 The Adventures of Pinocchio (1986)
 Madballs (1986–1987) – direct-to-video series co-produced with Hi-Tops Video
 Cricket's Club (1986–1987) – direct-to-video series co-produced with Hi-Tops Video
 My Pet Monster (1987)
 T. and T. (1988–1990) – live-action
 Clifford the Big Red Dog (1988) – direct-to-video release
 Babar (1989–1991; 2000) – co-produced with Ellipsanime and Kodansha in the revival
 Beetlejuice (1989–1991; co-production with The Geffen Film Company and Warner Bros. Television)

1990s

2000s

2010s

2020s

Upcoming

Short films
 Queen Street West (1973)
 Apple Cider Time (1975)
 Maple Spring (1977)
 Nishnawbe-Aski: The People and the Land (1977) (animation)
 Shoppin' for Clothes (1988)
 Journey to the Planets (1993) (animated sequences)
Stickin' Around (1994) (CBS interstitial series)
 The Larry Lard Show (1996) (pilot)
 Mr. Lucky (1996) (post-production)
 Jean-Luc & Dondoozat (1998) (short series; co-production with Bibo Films, Canal+ and Télétoon)
 The Most Magnificent Thing (2019)
 Toon Bops (2019–present) (short series)

Commercials

7 Up (early 1990s)
Bauer Athletic Footwear (1982)
Cadbury's Dairy Milk (1982)
Cap'n Crunch/Blockbuster Video (1994)
CBC Radio (two spots)
Chef Boyardee (early 1990s)
CIBC (mid 1990s)
Cow Brand
Dellcrest Children's Center (1979) (live-action PSA)
Garfield Ravioli (1994)
Green Park (early 1990s)
The Guardian
Heinz Scarios (1980, 1982)
Honeycomb (early 1990s)
IBM (1993)
Imperial Oil (1978)
M&M's (early 1990s)
Ocean Spray (1990s)
Ontario Dental Association (four spots; 1994)
Ontario Hydro (1979, 1981)
Philishave Lift and Cut 
Planters (1981, early 1990s)
Polar Date (1992)
Purina Butcher's Blend (1981, 1983)
Purina Puppy Chow (1980)
Raid (1982)
RE/MAX
Rice Krispies (early 1990s, 1994)
Shreddies (1989, 1992)
Silly Dillys (1989)
Stay Alert Stay Safe (1990)
Tetley Tea (early 1980s)
Toronto City Cycling Committee (1989)
Toronto Star (early 1980s)
WHSmith
White Swan (1991)

Footnotes

References

Notes

Corus Entertainment
Lists of animated films
Canadian television-related lists
Nelvana